Carapur is a census town in North Goa district  in the state of Goa, India.

Geography

It has an average elevation of 6 metres (20 feet).

Demographics
 India census, Carapur had a population of 5334. Males constitute 50% of the population and females 50%. Carapur has an average literacy rate of 76%, higher than the national average of 59.5%; with male literacy of 83% and female literacy of 69%. 11% of the population is under 6 years of age.

Carapur Website

References

Cities and towns in North Goa district